Doit may refer to:
 Digital Opportunity Investment Trust
 A doit musical ornamentation in jazz
 Duit, currency

See also 
 Comrade Deuch (born 1942), Cambodian activist, prison administrator, and defendant Kang Kek Iew